The South-East European Cooperation Process (SEECP) was launched on Bulgaria's initiative in 1996. At the Bulgaria-chaired meeting in Sofia, the Southeast Europe (SEE) countries laid the foundations for regional co-operation for the purposes of creating an atmosphere of trust, good neighbourly relations and stability.

A special characteristic of SEECP is that it is an original form of co-operation among the countries in the region launched on their own initiative, and not on the initiative of some other international organisation or countries. In that regard, the SEECP seeks to define itself as an authentic voice of SEE, complementary to the Stability Pact, Southeast European Cooperative Initiative or the Stabilisation and Association Process.

The basic goals of regional co-operation within SEECP include the strengthening of security and the political situation, intensification of economic relations and co-operation in the areas of human resources, democracy, justice, and battle against illegal activities. It is the intention of the SEECP to enable its members to approach the European and Euro-Atlantic structures through the strengthening of good neighbourly relations and transformation of the region into an area of peace and stability.

Membership 

Founding members:

 (joined as Serbia and Montenegro)

Joined later:
 (2005) 
 (2006)
 (2007)
 (2010)
 (2014)

Structure
The SEECP is a regional non-institutionalised process co-ordinated by the presiding country. The SEECP presidency lasts for one year and is rotated among the members. The presiding country presents the Process at international meetings and hosts the annual meeting of heads of state and government, foreign ministers meeting and a number of annual meetings of political directors. Depending on the situation, the presiding country may call extraordinary meetings.

Regional Cooperation Council
The Regional Cooperation Council was established at a 2008 meeting of foreign affairs ministers from the SEECP. The organization was founded by SEECP participants and is funded in part by the European Union to further promote European integration and cooperation. The RCC is led by a Secretary-General, currently Majlinda Bregu and consists of 46 participants. Participants are made up of the SEECP countries, along with other countries and supranational organizations who are interested in the stability and development of the region. A major project of the RCC is the development of the Regional Economic Area (REA), to better integrate South East European economies. The status of the REA has been uncertain with competing integration projects like the 2019 “mini-Schengen” agreement.

Chairmanship
Presiding country is changed each year:
 1996–97, Bulgaria
 1997–98, Greece
 1998–99, Turkey
 1999–2000, Romania
 2000–01, Republic of North Macedonia
 2001–02, Albania
 2002–03, Serbia and Montenegro 
 2003–04, Bosnia and Herzegovina
 April 2004 – May 2005, Romania
 May 2005 – May 2006, Greece
 May 2006 – May 2007, Croatia
 May 2007 – May 2008, Bulgaria
 2008–09, Moldova
 2009–10, Turkey
 2010–11, Montenegro
 2011–12, Serbia
 2012–13, Republic of North Macedonia
 2013–14, Romania
 2014–15, Albania
 2015–16, Bulgaria
 2016–17, Croatia
 2017–18, Slovenia
 2018–19, Bosnia and Herzegovina
 2019–20, Kosovo
 2020–21, Turkey
 2021–22, Greece
 2022–23, Montenegro

Meetings held
Heads of state and government meetings: 
 2–4 November 1997, Crete
 12–13 October 1998, Antalya
 12 February 2000, Bucharest
 25 October 2000, Skopje (extraordinary meeting)
 23 February 2001, Skopje
 28 March 2002, Tiranë
 9 April 2003, Belgrade
 21 April 2004, Sarajevo
 11 May 2005, Bucharest
 4 May 2006,  Thessaloniki
 11 May 2007, Zagreb
 21 May 2008, Pomorie
 5 June 2009, Chişinău
 21–23 June 2010, Istanbul
 1 June 2013, Ohrid (cancelled)
 25 June 2014, Bucharest
 26 May 2015, Tiranë
 1 June 2016, Sofia 
 30 June 2017, Dubrovnik
 24 April 2018, Kranj
 8–9 July 2019, Sarajevo (Refused by Kosovo)
 2020, Pristina (Cancelled due to COVID-19)
 17–18 June 2021, Antalya
 10–11 June 2022, Athens

Foreign ministers meetings: 
 6–7 July 1996, Sofia
 5–6 June 1997, Thessaloniki
 8–9 June 1998, Istanbul
 19 March 1999, Bucharest
 2 December 1999, Bucharest
 14 July 2000, Ohrid
 16 May 2001, Tiranë
 19 June 2002, Belgrade
 9 June 2003, Sarajevo
 22 October 2004, Bucharest
 24 January 2006, Athens
 1 March 2007, Zagreb
 14 June 2012, Belgrade
 22 May 2015, Tiranë
 23 April 2018, Kranj
 5 September 2018, Banja Luka
 25 June 2020, Pristina (Online)
 6 November 2020, Antalya

See also
Southeast Europe
Stability Pact for South Eastern Europe
Southeast European Cooperative Initiative (SECI)
Organization of the Black Sea Economic Cooperation (BSEC)

References

External links

Regional Secretariat for Parliamentary Cooperation in South East Europe
Regional Cooperation Council

International relations in Southeastern Europe
Southeastern Europe
International relations
1996 in international relations
Black Sea organizations